Straight Line Stitch is an American metalcore band from Knoxville, Tennessee.

History 
Straight Line Stitch initially was formed by Patrick Haynes and Seth Thacker in 1999 and issued an EP and a demo album before adding vocalist Alexis Brown from Clarksville, Tennessee to the band in 2003. Brown sang on their self-released 2006 effort To Be Godlike and then on an EP entitled The Word Made Flesh for which they filmed a video for the single "Remission". The video's director, Dale Resteghini, owned the production company Raging Nation Films; in 2007 he formed a subsidiary label of Koch Records called Raging Nation Records, and Straight Line Stitch became the label's first signing. Their first nationally distributed album, When Skies Wash Ashore, appeared on the imprint in 2008, with another album, The Fight of Our Lives, arriving in 2011. The Fight of Our Lives reached No. 5 on the Billboard Heatseekers chart and No. 34 on the Top Independent Albums chart. On July 26, 2014, during The Dog Days Of Summer Tour, Straight Line Stitch released their self-titled EP, while announcing they are still working on an album. In 2016, bassist Jason White and Alexis Brown had a baby.

The band will play their first show after a six-year hiatus in September 2021 at The Wildcatter Saloon: a benefit for the Texas Children's Cancer Center.

Band members

Current 
Alexis Brown – vocals (2003–present)
Jason White – guitars (2013–present), bass (2007–2013)
Darren McClelland – bass (2013)
Patrick Gleeson – guitars (2015)
Scott Haynes – drums (2015)

Former 

Patrick Gleeson – guitars
Justin Kelly – guitars
Ian Shuirr – drums
Kris Hawkins – guitars
Nathan Palmer – guitars
Edison Vidro – bass
Tim Chappell – guitars
Pat Pattison – guitars
Patrick Haynes – drums, guitars
Jason Pedigo – bass
Tim Saults – guitars
James Davila – vocals
Ryan McBroom – guitars
Kevin Smith – vocals
Adam Fontana – bass
Kanky Lora – drums
Kris Norris – guitars
Seth Thacker – guitars
Mark Kennedy – bass
Andrew Mikhail – guitars
Joey Nichols – drums
D-Drums (2012–2015)
Jackie Bergjans (2012–2015)
Ryan Bennett (2015 touring only)

Discography

Studio albums 
Everything is Nothing By Itself (2004)
To Be Godlike (2006)
When Skies Wash Ashore (Koch Records, 2008)
The Fight of Our Lives (E1 Music, 2011)

Extended plays 
The Barker (2001)
Jagermeister (2003)
The Word Made Flesh (2007)
Straight Line Stitch (2014)
Transparency (Pavement Entertainment, 2015)

Singles

References 

Metalcore musical groups from Tennessee
Musical groups from Knoxville, Tennessee